Queens Road may refer to:

Queens Road, Leicester, England
Queens Road, Kingston-upon-Thames, England
Queens Road, Richmond-upon-Thames, England
Queens Road, Peckham, England
Queens Road Peckham railway station, England
Queens Road (Sheffield), England
Queens Road, Walthamstow, England
Queen's Road, Cambridge, England
Queen's Road, Aberdeen, Scotland
Queens Road, Melbourne, Victoria, Australia
Queen's Road, Viti Levu, Fiji
Queen's Road, Hong Kong
Queen's Road, Bangalore, Bangalore
Queen's Road, Gibraltar
Queen's Road, Bahamas
Queen's Road, Singapore